Narasingapadu is a village in Guntur district of the Indian state of Andhra Pradesh. It is located in Nekarikallu mandal of Narasaraopet revenue division.

Governance 

Narasingapadu gram panchayat is the local self-government of the village. It is divided into wards and each ward is represented by a ward member.

Education 

As per the school information report for the academic year 2018–19, the village has only one MPP school.

Education 
The primary and secondary school education is imparted by government, aided and private schools, under the School Education Department of the state. The total number of students enrolled in primary, upper primary and high schools in the village are 41.

Zilla Parishad High School is a Zilla Parishad funded school, which provides secondary education in the village.

See also 
 List of villages in Guntur district

References 

Villages in Guntur district